Universidad Interglobal (The Interglobal University) is a Mexican private institution with six campuses located in Guerrero, Mexico City, Mexico State, Hidalgo, Querétaro, and Yucatán. The university offers study plans for regular students, students that work in the mornings, and for people who are only available on weekends.

Departments 
 Administration of business
 Law
 Pedagogy
 Psychology
 Information Technology

See also 
List of universities in Mexico

Private universities and colleges in Mexico